Philip Hedley Bowcock  was educated at Sedbergh School and was the chief executive of the bookmakers William Hill plc. He was previously chief financial officer of the company and before that CFO of Cineworld Group plc from 2011 to 2015.

References

Living people
1968 births
People from Staffordshire
People educated at Sedbergh School
English accountants